Vain elämää is the Finnish version of The Best Singers series broadcast on Finnish Nelonen commercial television channel fashioned on the successful Dutch series De beste zangers van Nederland. Each day, one artist would be chosen, and the remaining artists would perform covers of her or his songs and would be assessed by the original artist. The last day would be dedicated to duets of the most popular performances.

The title of the Finnish series is inspired by the 1973 song Vain elämää (fi. "it's only life") by Irwin Goodman.

Summary

Season 1 (2012)
The first Finnish edition started on 5 October 2012 and continued until 23 November 2012. The artists taking part were Erin, Kaija Koo, Katri Helena, Jonne Aaron, Cheek, Neumann and Jari Sillanpää.

Many of the renditions during the series have charted on the Finnish Singles Chart and the self-titled compilation album has topped the Finnish Albums Chart.

Performances

Albums

Vain elämää
At the end of the series, a compilation album Vain elämää was released WEA / Warner Music containing 21 tracks. The album topped the Finnish Albums Chart and was certified double platinum.

Track listing
 Katri Helena – "Jos mä oisin sä"
 Cheek – "Tinakenkätyttö"
 Neumann – "Bum bum bum"
 Jonne Aaron – "Satulinna"
 Kaija Koo – "Vanha sydän"
 Jari Sillanpää – "Sinä ja minä"
 Erin – "Vasten auringon siltaa"
 Cheek – "Kaduilla tuulee"
 Neumann – "The Moment of Our Love"
 Katri Helena – "Vanha nainen hunningolla"
 Erin – "Vapaa"
 Jonne Aaron – "Syytön"
 Kaija Koo – "Mennään hiljaa markkinoille"
 Jari Sillanpää – "Liekeissä"
 Cheek – "Puhelinlangat laulaa"
 Katri Helena – "Autiotalo"
 Jari Sillanpää – "Nuoruus on seikkailu"
 Kaija Koo – "Won't Let Go"
 Jonne Aaron – "Kylmä ilman sua"
 Erin – "Nahkatakkinen tyttö"
 Neumann – "Anna mulle tähtitaivas"

Vain elämää jatkuu
Due to its popularity, a new compilation album was released on 21 December 2012 titled Vain elämää jatkuu (meaning Vain elämää continues) WEA / Warner Music. The album topped the Finnish Albums Chart. It has also gone double platinum on advance orders.

Track listing
 Katri Helena – "Kuka keksi rakkauden"
 Kaija Koo – "Katson sineen taivaan"
 Jonne Aaron – "Lintu ja lapsi"
 Jari Sillanpää – "Jealous Sky"
 Erin – "Unta en saa"
 Neumann – "Satasen laina"
 Cheek – "Levoton Tuhkimo"
 Kaija Koo – "Mikä siinä on"
 Jonne Aaron – "Rio Ohoi"
 Katri Helena – "Olen elossa taas"
 Neumann – "Tuhlaajapoika"
 Erin – "Jos menet pois"
 Jari Sillanpää – "Teflon love"
 Kaija Koo – "Pariisi – Helsinki"
 Cheek – "Giving Up!"
 Katri Helena – "Valkeaa unelmaa"
 Erin – "Mitä tänne jää"
 Jari Sillanpää – "Kaunis rietas onnellinen"
 Jonne Aaron – "Jippikayjei"
 Cheek – "Rakastuin mä looseriin"
 Neumann – "Tuulikello"

Season 2 (2013)
Nelonen confirmed a second season, scheduled for autumn 2013. It ran from 4 October to 22 November 2013 with repeats and live performances from 5 October to 23 November 2013. The artists participating in the second season were Maarit Hurmerinta, Laura Närhi, Anna Abreu, Ilkka Alanko, Jukka Poika, Juha Tapio and Pauli Hanhiniemi.

Performances

Albums

Vain elämää – Kausi 2
At the end of the series 2, a compilation album Vain elämää – Kausi 2 was released WEA / Warner Music containing 21 tracks. The album topped the Finnish Albums Chart.

Vain elämää – Kausi 2 jatkuu
Due to its popularity, a new compilation album was released in December 2013 titled Vain elämää – Kausi 2 jatkuu (meaning Vain elämää season 2 continues) on WEA / Warner Music. The album reached number 2 on the Finnish Albums Chart.

Season 3 (2014)
Nelonen ran a third season that aired from 19 September to 7 November 2014. The artists participating in the third season are Samuli Edelmann, Elastinen, Paula Koivuniemi, Vesa-Matti Loiri, Jenni Vartiainen, Paula Vesala, Toni Wirtanen.

Performances

Season 4 (2015)
A fourth season began on Nelonen on 18 September 2015. The artists participating in the fourth season are Vicky Rosti, VilleGalle, Maija Vilkkumaa, Anssi Kela, Sanni, Pave Maijanen, and Antti Tuisku.

Performances

See also
The Best Singers (series)

References

External links
 Official website

Finnish reality television series
Nelonen original programming